Adrian Quist defeated John Bromwich 6–4, 3–6, 6–3, 2–6, 6–3 in the final to win the men's singles tennis title at the 1948 Australian Championships.

Seeds
The seeded players are listed below. Adrian Quist is the champion; others show the round in which they were eliminated.

  John Bromwich (finalist)
  Adrian Quist (champion)
  Bill Sidwell (semifinals)
  Geoffrey Brown (semifinals)
  Colin Long (quarterfinals)
  Frank Sedgman (quarterfinals)
  Lionel Brodie (third round)
  Robert McCarthy (quarterfinals)
  James Brink (third round)
  Eddie Moylan (quarterfinals)

Draw

Key
 Q = Qualifier
 WC = Wild card
 LL = Lucky loser
 r = Retired

Finals

Earlier rounds

Section 1

Section 2

Section 3

Section 4

External links
 

1948
1948 in Australian tennis